NH 28 may refer to:

 National Highway 28 (India)
 New Hampshire Route 28, United States